The Dollberge are a small mountain range in the northern Saarland and the adjoining part of the state of Rhineland-Palatinate in Germany. They form a southeastern element of the Schwarzwälder Hochwald, a region in the Hunsrück mountains, and are up to 
.

Geography

Location 
The Dollberge are an elongated chain of low mountains running from southeast to northwest through the Saar-Hunsrück Nature Park roughly from Nonnweiler (Saarland) to Börfink (Rhineland-Palatinate). The southwestern tip of the Dollberge lies in the northern Saarland near Nonnweiler; the larger northeastern line of the mountain ridge is located within Rhineland-Palatinate.

Mountains 
The mountains of the Dollberge include the following – sorted by height in metres (m) above sea level (NN):
 Friedrichskopf (707.4 m), south of Börfink in the parish of Brücken, Rhineland-Palatinate
 Dollberg (695.4 m), southeast of Neuhütten, the highest mountain in the Saarland
 Vorkastell (626.0 m) (mountain spur and castle ruins), southeast of Börfink, Rhineland-Palatinate

Rivers and streams 
Between the Dollberge and the Schwarzwalder Hochwald is the Prims Reservoir through which the River Prims flows. A tributary of the Prims, the Allbach (Altbach), rises on the Friedrichskopf. The Traunbach flows past the Dollberge to the northeast.

Hillfort of Otzenhausen 
In the areas of the southwestern foothills of the Dollberge between Nonnweiler and the Dollberg is the hillfort of Otzenhausen, a Celtic refuge fort (oppidum).

References

External links 
 Dollberge, a detailed map of the Dollberge around the Dollberg

Central Uplands
Mountain ranges of Germany
Landforms of Saarland
Mountain ranges of Rhineland-Palatinate
Natural regions of the Hunsrück